Michael T. Turvey (born 1992 in Woking, Surrey, England) is the Board of Trustees' Distinguished Professor of Experimental Psychology at the University of Connecticut and a Senior Scientist at Haskins Laboratories in New Haven, Connecticut. He is best known for his pioneering work in ecological psychology and in applying dynamic systems approach for the study of motor behavior. He is the founder of the Center for the Ecological Study of Perception and Action. His research spans a number of areas including: dynamic touch and haptics, interlimb coordination, visual perception and optic flow, postural stability, visual word recognition and speech perception. Along with William Mace and Robert Shaw, he has been one of the leading explicators of the ecological psychology of J. J. Gibson. His pioneering work with J. A. Scott Kelso and Peter N. Kugler introduced the physical language of complex systems to the understanding of perception and action. He also helped to introduce the ideas of a Russian motor control theorist, Nikolai Bernstein, and his colleagues to a larger audience. Working with Georgije Lukatela and other colleagues at Haskins Laboratories, he has exploited the dual nature of the Serbo-Croatian orthography to help understand word recognition.

Turvey is also the winner of the Ig Nobel Prize in Physics along with
Professor Ramesh Balasubramaniam of Cognitive & Information Sciences at the University of California, Merced, for exploring and explaining the dynamics of hula-hooping.
(Reference: "Coordination Modes in the Multisegmental Dynamics of Hula Hooping," Ramesh Balasubramaniam and Michael T. Turvey, Biological Cybernetics, vol. 90, no. 3, March 2004, pp. 176–90.)

Turvey graduated from Loughborough University (then called Loughborough College) in 1963 with a DLC (Diploma of Loughborough College) in Physical Education, with First Class Honours. He received an MA (1964) in Physical Education from the Ohio State University. He received a PhD (1967) in Experimental and Physiological Psychology from the Ohio State University under Delos Wickens, with thesis The nature of information loss in the visual preperceptual system.

Representative publications
 Turvey, M. T. (1973). On peripheral and central processes in vision: Inferences from an information-processing analysis of masking with patterned stimuli. Psychological Review, 80, 1–52.
 Turvey, M. T. (1977). Contrasting orientations to the theory of visual information processing. Psychological Review, 84, 67–88.
 Kugler, N. P., Kelso, J. A. S., & Turvey, M. T. (1980). On the concept of coordinative structures as dissipative structures: I. Theoretical lines of convergence. Tutorials in Motor Behavior, G. E. Stelmach and J. Requin, eds., North-Holland Publishing Company.
 Fowler, C. A., Rubin, P. E., Remez, R. E., & Turvey, M. T. (1980). Implications for speech production of a general theory of action. In B. Butterworth (Ed.), Language Production, Vol. I: Speech and Talk (pp. 373–420). New York: Academic Press.
 Turvey, M. T., & Carello, C. (1985). The equation of information and meaning from the perspectives of situation semantics and Gibson's ecological realism. Linguistics and Philosophy, 8, 81–90.
 Turvey, M. T. (1990). Coordination. American Psychologist, 45(8), 938–953.
 Turvey, M. T., Shockley, K., & Carello, C. (1999). Affordance, proper function, and the physical basis of perceived heaviness. Cognition, 17, B17-B26.
 Kunkler-Peck, A., & Turvey, M. T. (2000). Hearing shape. Journal of Experimental Psychology: Human Perception and Performance, 26, 279–294.
 Lukatela, G., & Turvey, M. T. (2000). An evaluation of the two-cycles model of phonology assembly. Journal of Memory and Language, 42, 183–207.
 Kim, N-G., Fajen, B., & Turvey, M. T. (2000). Perceiving circular heading in noncanonical flow fields. Journal of Experimental Psychology: Human Perception and Performance, 26, 31–56.
 Goodman, L., Riley, M., Mitra, S., & Turvey, M. T. (2000). Advantages of rhythmic movements at resonance: Minimal active degrees of freedom, minimal noise, and maximal predictability. Journal of Motor Behavior, 32, 3–8.
 Turvey, M. T., & Fonseca, S. (2009). Nature of motor control: perspectives and issues. Advances in Experimental Medicine and Biology, 629, 93–123.

See also
Cognitive science
Embodied cognitive science
Experimental psychology
Haptic perception
Ecological psychology
Dynamic systems
Haskins Laboratories
James J. Gibson
Perception
Psychology
University of Connecticut

References

External links
 Center for the Ecological Study of Perception and Action
 Haskins Laboratories
 Turvey page at Uconn
 University of Connecticut Psychology

21st-century American psychologists
Living people
Haskins Laboratories scientists
Speech perception researchers
University of Connecticut faculty
1992 births